James Gilliam may refer to:

 James Gilliam, also known as James Kelly (pirate) (died 1701), English pirate
 James Frank Gilliam (1915–1990), American classical scholar and historian of ancient Rome